This is a list of indoor arenas in Australia.

Indoor arenas
Total capacity shown. In some cases this may differ from seating capacity.

• Retractable roof venues
* Temporary tenants

See also

List of Australian Football League grounds
List of Australian cricket grounds
List of ice rinks in Australia
List of National Basketball League (Australia) venues
List of Australian rugby league stadiums
List of Australian rugby union stadiums
List of soccer stadiums in Australia
List of Oceanian stadiums by capacity

References

External links

Indoor arenas in Australia
Indoor arenas
Australia